Peripsocus consobrinus is a species of Psocoptera from the Peripsocidae family. It is known from the type locality in Somerset, Britain I. and Scotland.

References

Peripsocidae
Insects described in 1951
Endemic fauna of England
Psocoptera of Europe